Vít Přindiš (born 14 April 1989) is a Czech slalom canoeist who has competed at the international level since 2005.

He won six medals at the ICF Canoe Slalom World Championships with two golds (K1: 2022, K1 team: 2017), three silvers (K1: 2017, K1 team: 2014, 2019) and a bronze (K1 team: 2018). He also won 13 medals (10 golds and 3 silvers) at the European Canoe Slalom Championships.

Přindiš won the overall World Cup title in the K1 class in 2017 and 2021 and in Extreme slalom in 2021. He is currently ranked 4th by the ICF, having finished the 2017 and 2018 seasons as the World No. 1 in the K1 event.

His father Pavel is a former slalom canoeist and a medalist from World Championships.

World Cup individual podiums

References

External links

1989 births
Czech male canoeists
Living people
Medalists at the ICF Canoe Slalom World Championships
Canoeists from Prague